The Masafuera rayadito (Aphrastura masafuerae) is a rare bird endemic to Alejandro Selkirk Island (Isla Más Afuera, Outermost Island) in the Juan Fernández Islands. The species is a member of the ovenbird family and only one of three species in the rayadito genus. The species' natural habitat is humid montane scrub, dominated by tree ferns (Dicksonia externa) and ferns (Lophosoria quadripinnata) between 800–1300 m above sea level (though they will descend lower during the austral winter).

Masafuera rayaditos travel in pairs while feeding on arthropods; feeding occurs in the wood understory and occasionally on the ground in the leaf-litter. Nesting occurs at high altitudes (above 1200 m), in small natural crevices in rocks.

The Masafuera rayadito is a critically endangered species. Surveys of the species in the 1980s found between 500-1000 birds but by 1992 that had dropped to 200 and by 2002 only 140. The species is threatened by introduced species, particularly goats which trample and degrade habitat, but also probably rats and feral cats.

References

Remsen, V. (2003) Family Furnariidae (Ovenbirds). in del Hoyo J., Elliott A. & Christie D.A. (2003) Handbook of the Birds of the World. Volume 8. Broadbills to Tapaculos Lynx Edicions, Barcelona 
Gonzalez J. (2014). Phylogenetic position of the most endangered Chilean bird: the Masafuera Rayadito (Aphrastura masafuerae; Furnariidae). Tropical Conservation Science.  7:677-689.
Hahn, I et al. (2004) "Nest sites and breeding ecology of the Másafuera Rayadito ( Aphrastura masafuerae) on Alejandro Selkirk Island, Chile" Journal of Ornithology 145(2):93-97

External links
BirdLife Species Factsheet.

Masafuera rayadito
Alejandro Selkirk Island
Birds of Chile
Endemic birds of Chile
Endemic fauna of the Juan Fernández Islands
Critically endangered animals
Critically endangered biota of South America
Masafuera rayadito
Masafuera rayadito
Taxobox binomials not recognized by IUCN